Croft may refer to:

Occupations
 Croft (land), a small area of land, often with a crofter's dwelling
 Crofting, small-scale food production
 Bleachfield, an open space used for the bleaching of fabric, also called a croft

Locations

In the United Kingdom
Croft, Cheshire, in the Borough of Warrington
Croft, Leicestershire
Croft, Lincolnshire
Croft, Herefordshire
Croft Castle, Herefordshire
Croft-on-Tees, North Yorkshire
Croft (Aberdeenshire castle), a former keep in Scotland
The Croft, a listed house in Totteridge, Barnet
Croft Circuit, a motor racing circuit in northeast England

In the United States
Croft, California, in El Dorado County
Croft, Kansas

People
Croft (surname)
Crofts (surname)

See also
Crofts End, Bristol
Crofton, Cumbria
Crofton, British Columbia
Ashcroft (disambiguation)
Undercroft